Midnapore College, established in 1873, is the oldest college in Midnapore, in the Paschim Medinipur district of West Bengal. It offers undergraduate and postgraduate courses in arts and sciences. It is affiliated to Vidyasagar University. It has been given Autonomous status by University Grants Commission from 2014–15 Session. It is only the fourth aided college to be granted the tag after St Xavier's College, Ramkrishna Mission Narendrapur and RKM Belur.

History

Midnapore College was established in 1873 under the affiliation of the University of Calcutta and with the status of government-sponsored college in 1956. It is the oldest college in the district of Midnapore.

This college started as a school in 1836 and later in 1873 it was handed over to the then-British Government and was raised to the status of second grade college. It was controlled by a governing body with district magistrate as ex-officio president. It became first grade degree science college in 1924.

Role in Indian independence movement
It played the pioneering role in the spread of higher education and in the freedom movement of India.

The past of the college is a saga of meritorious services to all walks of life. Under the aegis of the British government the college began disseminating Western education in the interest of rational and scientific education which was led by Ram Mohan Roy. The college became a part and parcel of Bengal Renaissance. Midnapore Collegiate School is in close vicinity. Khudiram Bose, India's first martyr in the freedom movement against the British, was from Midnapore city and was a student of Midnapore Collegiate School. The Freedom Movement was greatly influenced by the college teachers, too. Three teachers — Tarak Das Ghosh, Thakopada Biswas and Binoy Jiban Ghosh — were dismissed from service for their involvement in the movement during 1933. In 1985, the college's affiliation changed from Calcutta University to Vidyasagar University. Recently University Grants Commission has given Midnapore College an autonomous status from 2014 to 2015 Session.

Departments and courses

The college offers different undergraduate and postgraduate courses and aims at imparting education to the undergraduates of lower- and middle-class people of Midnapore and its adjoining areas.

Science
Science faculty consists of the departments of Chemistry, Physics, Mathematics, Statistics, Computer Science, Computer Application, Botany, Zoology, Physiology, Microbiology, Nutrition, Electronics and Economics.

Arts
Arts faculty consists of departments of Bengali, English, Sanskrit, Hindi, History, Geography, Political Science, Philosophy, Sociology, Physical Education and Education.

Location
The college is located in the heart of Midnapore city in the district Paschim Medinipur, formerly called Midnapore. It is easy to reach the college. It is 2 km away from Midnapore Railway Station and 14 km from Kharagpur Railway Station, both under the South Eastern Railway. Midnapore Central Bus Stand is 1 km away from the college.

Accreditation
The college is recognized by the University Grants Commission (UGC). In 2006 it was accredited by the National Assessment and Accreditation Council, and awarded A+ grade. In 2012, then it was re—accredited Grade A with 3.58 out of 4.00 CGPA Score. Now it is re-accredited and awarded by Grade A+ (CGPA-3.60 out of 4.0) by the NAAC in 2017.

Student life
There are two hostels for male and female students, accommodating 60 male students and 114 female students. Students coming from remote village areas are preferred. But several private messes are available. The socio-economic culture has a direct influence from the students come to study at Midnapore.

There are two sections running in the college, morning and day.

Facilities 
Different types of facilities are available in the college. Students who cannot undergo formal studies, can pursue bachelor and postgraduate degree from distance education centre of Indira Gandhi National Open University. Basic science research takes place in the Midnapore College centre for Scientific Culture which is set up by the Indian Association of Physics Teachers. N. C. Rana sky observation centre was established for study of astronomy. This sky observation centre is also served as weather prediction centre of Midnapore district. Midnapore college library has large number of collections for which it may be used as a research centre. The college has opened a Career Counseling Center operating for last few years for providing the opportunities for current and passed out students at different Government as well as corporate sectors. There are lot of options of reference books in the central library of the college. The reading room is a very good option to the students. They can read books in their leisure periods.

Achievements
Midnapore college has been identified for "Colleges with Potential for Excellence" (CPE) for XI Plan (Phase-III) by University Grants Commission in 2010.

University Grants Commission has given Midnapore College an "Autonomous" status. It is only the fourth college in West Bengal to be granted the status after St Xavier's College, Ramkrishna Mission, Narendrapur and RKM, Belur. The college from 2014 to 2015 session is allowed to frame its own curricula and conduct their own examinations. The results too are being published by the college themselves. Only the marksheet will be published with the approval of Vidyasagar University.

Notable alumni 

 Dinesh Gupta
 Pradyot Kumar Bhattacharya
 Nirmal Jibon Ghosh
 Swapan Kumar Pati
 Somen Mahapatra
 Surjya Kanta Mishra
 Gyan Singh Sohanpal
 Tamal Bandyopadhyay
 Prabodh Panda
 Jyoti Jibon Ghosh
 Prabhanshu Sekhar Pal

See also
List of institutions of higher education in West Bengal
Education in India
Education in West Bengal

References

External links
 
 

Universities and colleges in Paschim Medinipur district
Colleges affiliated to Vidyasagar University
Educational institutions established in 1873
1873 establishments in India